The Window (Panjereh)  is a 1970 Iranian Persian-genre drama Romantic film directed by Jalal Moghaddam, and starring Behrouz Vossoughi, Googoosh, and Zhaleh Olov.

Plot summary

Cast
 Behrouz Vossoughi as Sohrab Salari
 Googoosh as Leili (as Faegheh Atashin)
 Farrokh Sajedi as Jamshid
 Hassan Raziani as Asghar Zhila
 Mohsen Mahdavi as Sohrab's uncle (Mostafa Salari)
 Hasan Khayat-Bashi as Police officer

References

External links 
 

1970 films
1970 romantic drama films
1970s Persian-language films
Iranian romantic drama films
Iranian remakes of American films
Iranian black-and-white films